Who's Feeling Young Now? is the third album by Punch Brothers, released February 14, 2012.

Background
The band Punch Brothers recorded the album at Blackbird Studio in Nashville, Tennessee with producer/engineer Jacquire King. The album has been described as "remarkably close to the indie-rock sounds of today" for a bluegrass album. The album is considered more accessible than the band's previous work, based on a decision not to over-complicate the music: "instead of adding parts, you’re reinforcing existing parts."

"Movement and Location", a song written by Chris Thile, a long time baseball fan of the Chicago Cubs, was inspired by former Cubs pitcher Greg Maddux's obsession over the movement and location of his pitches.

Track listing

Bonus Tracks (vinyl only)

Personnel 
 Chris Thile - mandolin, vocals
 Gabe Witcher - fiddle, vocals
 Noam Pikelny - banjo, vocals
 Chris Eldridge - guitar, vocals
 Paul Kowert - double bass, vocals

References 

2012 albums
Punch Brothers albums
Nonesuch Records albums
Albums produced by Jacquire King